Cuz I Can is the first album by the Swedish pop rock singer Ana Johnsson under the name Ana. The album was released exclusively in Sweden on April 14, 2004. It was later worldwide-released as The Way I Am, so that this latter is sometimes considered to be the first album by Johnsson. The latter album has a different cover and track listing; otherwise the albums are identical. The Way I Am contains the first seven songs from Cuz I Can and some new tracks, including the huge hit "We Are", which was the official soundtrack for the Spider-Man 2 film, "Don't Cry for Pain" and "Coz I Can", a remix of "Cuz I Can". The leftover tracks were included as B-sides on the later released singles.

Singles released from Cuz I Can were "The Way I Am", "Life" and "Cuz I Can", of which only "Life" entered the Swedish Singles Chart, at number 17.

Track listing

Singles

Credits
Vocals, backing vocals: Ana Johnsson
Producer, mixer, instruments: Leif Larson
Producer, mixer, instruments: Marcus Black
Producer, mixer, instruments: Ulf Lindström, Johan Ekhé
Producer, mixer, arranged, keyboards, programming, backing vocals: Jörgen Elofsson
Mixer: Bo Reimer
Guitars, bass guitar: Ola Gustavsson
Drums, percussion, Christer Jansson
Drums: Olle Dahlsted
Guitars: Mattias Blomdahl
Programming: Peter Wennerberg, Anders Herrlin
Photography by: Micke Eriksson
Design by: Jennie Eiserman
A&R Joakim Åström

Ana Johnsson albums
2004 debut albums
Articles containing video clips